USS Lorikeet (AMc-49) was an Accentor-class coastal minesweeper acquired by the U.S. Navy for the dangerous task of removing mines from minefields laid in the water to prevent ships from passing.

The first ship to be named Lorikeet by the Navy was laid down by Greenport Basin and Construction Company, Greenport, Long Island, New York, 28 February 1941; launched 19 April; sponsored by Miss Mildred Howard; and commissioned 8 August 1941.

Attached to the Inshore Patrol, Lorikeet was based at Staten Island for sweeping operations to keep vital New York Harbor free from the menace of enemy mines. In November 1944 she was transferred to the 1st Naval District and swept the sealanes approaching Boston, Massachusetts.

As World War II closed, she arrived Charleston, South Carolina, 8 August 1945. Lorikeet decommissioned there 14 December, was struck from the Navy list 8 January 1946, and was turned over to the Maritime Commission. She was sold to Karl H. Anderson of Atlantic Beach, Florida, 31 July 1947 and was subsequently sold to Nassau Fertilizer & Oil Co., Inc., Fernandina, Florida.

References

External links 
 NavSource Online: Mine Warfare Vessel Photo Archive - Lorikeet (AMc 49)

 

Accentor-class minesweepers
World War II minesweepers of the United States
Ships built in Greenport, New York
1941 ships